Alfred Kieffer (11 January 1904 – 11 October 1987) was a Luxembourgian footballer. He competed in the men's tournament at the 1924 Summer Olympics.

References

External links
 

1904 births
1987 deaths
Luxembourgian footballers
Luxembourg international footballers
Olympic footballers of Luxembourg
Footballers at the 1924 Summer Olympics
People from Rumelange
Association football defenders
FC Differdange 03 players